George Charles Munns (1877–1954) was a United Party Member of Parliament in New Zealand.

Biography

Early life and career
George Munns was born in England in 1877 and later emigrated to New Zealand in 1892. He then took an interest in the mining business and became the chairman of directors of the Maoriland Mining Company.

Political career

For seven years Munns was a member of the Gisborne Borough Council, including three years as the chairman of the council's works committee, an later he was a member of the Gisborne School Committee. After moving to Auckland he continued his interest in local politics and became President of the Roskill East Ratepayers' Association.

He won the Auckland electorate of Roskill in the 1928 general election, but in 1931 he was defeated by the Labour candidate Arthur Shapton Richards. In 1930 he became his party's senior Whip, serving in that capacity until his defeat.

Notes

References

|-

1877 births
1954 deaths
New Zealand Liberal Party MPs
Members of the New Zealand House of Representatives
New Zealand MPs for Auckland electorates
Unsuccessful candidates in the 1931 New Zealand general election
British emigrants to New Zealand